Vienna is a Washington Metro station on the Orange Line in Fairfax, Virginia. The station is in the median of Interstate 66 at Nutley Street, also known as Virginia State Route 243, in Fairfax.

The station can be accessed from I-66 without merging onto Nutley Street by a series of ramps that transport commuters to the station's north and south side parking complexes. From the parking areas, riders use elevated walkways that bridge the east and westbound lanes of I-66 to reach the platform and mezzanine. The station provides easy access to the nearby Town of Vienna, the City of Fairfax, and the main campus of George Mason University. Service began on June 7, 1986.

Station layout

History
Although originally identified as the western terminus of the Orange Line in the 1968 plan, by 1978 Fairfax County was debating whether the initial terminus should be at the Vienna location or at another location in Tysons Corner. After much public debate and public comment, the Fairfax County Board of Supervisors endorsed the Vienna routing. The endorsement was made after determining it would cost an additional $59 million and take another five years to complete the line to Tysons. Metro service to Tysons Corner was later established as part of the Silver Line, which opened in 2014.

The groundbreaking for the station took place on September 8, 1982. At the time, the final facility was to have cost $17.6 million with parking for 2,000 vehicles. After nearly four years of construction, the station opened on June 7, 1986, as the western terminus of the Orange Line.

By 1993, officials in Fairfax City were looking to add "Fairfax" to the station name. In March 1999, the station name was changed to Vienna/Fairfax–GMU, which was misleading because a drive or ride on an infrequent CUE Bus or Metrobus is required to reach Fairfax City and GMU.
In 2011, the Metro Board adopted guidelines limiting station names to nineteen characters. Stations with longer names were split in two: Vienna's "primary name" went back to Vienna and Fairfax–GMU became a "secondary name" on Metro maps.

In May 2018, Metro announced an extensive renovation of platforms at twenty stations across the system. The platforms at the Vienna station would be rebuilt starting in mid-2020.

From May 23 until September 7, 2020, this station was closed due to the platform reconstruction project which closed stations west of Ballston–MU station.

Transit-oriented development 
In line with high-density development, the Fairlee Metro-West project aims to increase the housing density around the Vienna station from 60 single family homes to 2,250 condominiums and townhouses. This development has been controversial, as many Orange Line commuters believe the system will be pushed beyond capacity at rush hours as a result. As of May 2009, the project is under construction.

References

External links

Official website at WMATA.com

1986 establishments in Virginia
Bus stations in Virginia
Stations on the Orange Line (Washington Metro)
Railway stations in highway medians
Railway stations in the United States opened in 1986
Transportation in Fairfax County, Virginia
Washington Metro stations in Virginia